Garnish, a town located on the west coast of the Burin Peninsula, was well known for its lumbering and now for its lobstering operations. The Way Office was established in 1852 and the first Waymaster was Henry Campe. In 2021, the town had a population of 542.

Demographics 

See also
List of lighthouses in Canada
List of cities and towns in Newfoundland and Labrador
Burin Peninsula
Newfoundland outport

References

External links
 Town of Garnish
Garnish - Encyclopedia of Newfoundland and Labrador, vol. 2, p. 483-484.
 Aids to Navigation Canadian Coast Guard

Populated coastal places in Canada
Towns in Newfoundland and Labrador
Lighthouses in Newfoundland and Labrador